The 2010 Chinggis Khan Judo World Cup was held in 24 and 25 July 2010 in Ulaanbaatar, Mongolia.

Medalists

Men

Women

References

2010 in judo